Bodham is  a civil parish in the English county of Norfolk. The village is 27.2 miles north north west of Norwich, 6.4 miles west of Cromer and 131 miles north north east  of London. The village lies 3.1 miles south west of the nearest  town of Sheringham.The nearest railway station is at Sheringham for the Bittern Line which runs between Cromer and Norwich. The nearest airport is Norwich International Airport. The village is situated on the A148 coast road which links the town of King’s Lynn to Cromer. The civil parish had in 2001 census, a population of 435, increasing to 484 at the 2011 Census. For the purposes of local government, the parish falls within the district of North Norfolk.

History
Bodham has an entry in the Domesday Book of 1085. In the great book Bodham is recorded by the names Bod(en)ham, and Botham. The main landholders Hugh de Montfort and Walter Giffard. The main tenant was said to be Ralph.

The villages name means either 'Boda's homestead/village' or 'Boda's hemmed-in land'.

Village sign
The village sign shows a representation of a medieval tax collector going about his employment. The tax collector's name was Boda and is mentioned in the Domesday Book, which confirms his existence and the fact that he lived there. Bodham means "Boda's Village".

Village amenities

Bodham & Beckham Village Hall
Bodham and Beckham Village Hall is a modern hall less than twenty years old.  It is regularly used by Bodham Bingo Club, yoga classes, church events. Regular quiz night fundraisers are held four times a year, in February, May, September and December.  The hall is heated by electric heaters. Grants from Norfolk Community Foundation have been obtained to put in equipment for film showing and regular monthly shows are held on Friday during the winter. A loop system has also been installed to help the hearing impaired.

Bodham Playing Field 
Bodham Playing Field which is situated on Cromer Road has a full-size football pitch and a 'juniors' pitch. The Playing Field Committee has had the pavilion refurbished with the help of grants from Bodham Bingo Club, Awards for All Lottery Fund and North Norfolk District Council's Active Communities Fund. There are two changing rooms, showers, toilets and a fully fitted kitchen, all inside the pavilion. Attached is a referees room. An additional facility is a disabled toilet accessible with the use of a RADAR Key. The Playing Field Committee have now taken over responsibility for the floodlights.  The Bodham Football Club is made up of players from outside the village. Many fund raising events are held throughout the year to support the playing Field. Grants have been obtained to purchase exercise equipment. This was made possible by grants from Norfolk Community Foundation, Awards for All, Bodham Bingo Club, Sports Relief, Active Norfolk, Bodham Big Weekend and Bodham Horticultural Show.

War Memorial
Bodham's War Memorial takes the form of two plaques attached to the outside of All Saints' Churchtower. It lists the following names for the First World War:
 Sergeant William E. Dix (d.1916), 9th Battalion, Royal Norfolk Regiment
 Private George C. Tuck (d.1916), 1st Battalion, Royal Norfolk Regiment
 Private George Nichols (d.1916), 9th Battalion, Royal Norfolk Regiment
 Private Walter Balls (1889-1917), 9th Battalion, Royal Norfolk Regiment
 Private William Gant (1894-1917), 9th Battalion, Royal Norfolk Regiment
 Private William Emery (d.1918), 9th Battalion, Royal Sussex Regiment

And, the following for the Second World War:
 Lance-Corporal Francis W. Digby (1921-1942), 5th Battalion, Royal Norfolk Regiment

References 

http://kepn.nottingham.ac.uk/map/place/Norfolk/Bodham

External links

North Norfolk
Villages in Norfolk
Civil parishes in Norfolk